Forrestal Hickman (born April 15, 1993) is an offensive tackle for the Sioux Falls Storm of the Indoor Football League (IFL). Hickman signed with the San Diego Chargers as an undrafted free agent in 2015. He played in two preseason games for the Chargers, and was then signed to the Montreal Alouettes practice squad for 2015 season. Hickman was raised to the active roster and played the final game of the year for Montreal. In 2016, he played in both preseason games before being cut by Montreal. He was then signed by the Colorado Crush of the Indoor Football League, where he started all but one game. He attended Missouri University of Science and Technology where he played left tackle.

Colorado Crush

On November 14, 2016, Hickman signed with the Colorado Crush of the Indoor Football League (IFL).

Sioux Falls Storm
On October 10, 2017, Hickman signed with the Sioux Falls Storm.

References

External links
 Missouri S&T Miners bio
 San Diego Chargers bio

Living people
American football offensive tackles
Canadian football offensive linemen
American players of Canadian football
People from Topeka, Kansas
1993 births
Missouri S&T Miners football players
San Diego Chargers players
Montreal Alouettes players
Colorado Crush (IFL) players
Sioux Falls Storm players